is a Japanese actor, singer, and model. He is represented by Stardust Promotion's Section 3. He is the leader of Stardust's music collective Ebidan unit Dish. As a member of Dish, he is nicknamed Takumi, stylized as TAKUMI.

Biography
Kitamura was scouted by Stardust Promotion when he was in third grade of elementary school. His first singing debut was "Risu ni Koi Shita Shōnen" in the NHK series Minna no Uta in February and March 2008. Later in June Kitamura's first film appearance was Dive!!. He won the 2009 Reader Model Award of the magazine Shōgaku Rokunensei in 2009. In the summer of 2010, Kitamura joined the actor unit Ebidan. He later joined Ebidan's dance rock band Dish in December 2011. Kitamura is the leader of the band as its lead vocalist and guitarist.

In August 2021, he tested positive for COVID-19.

Takumi recently starred in the live-action film Tokyo Revengers. The film received positive reviews, and is one of the highest grossing Japanese films of 2021.

Discography

Singles

Filmography

TV drama

Films

Video on demand

Music videos

Advertisements

Direct-to-video

Awards

References

External links
 
 
 Takumi Kitamura at wiki informer

Japanese male child actors
Japanese male models
Stardust Promotion artists
Male actors from Tokyo
1997 births
Living people
21st-century Japanese male actors
21st-century Japanese male singers